Da'an Temple is a Buddhist temple located in Yuhua District, Changsha, Hunan, China.

History 
The original temple dates back to the Qing dynasty (1644–1911).

After the founding of the Communist State, in 1952, the Communist Party launched the Land Reform Movement in which the temple was demolished. Reconstruction of the temple, commenced in 1997 and was completed in 2020.

Architecture 
Now the existing main buildings include Shanmen Hall, Mahavira Hall, Kṣitigarbha Hall and Guanyin Hall.

References 

Buddhist temples in Changsha
Buildings and structures in Yuhua District, Changsha
Tourist attractions in Changsha
20th-century establishments in China
20th-century Buddhist temples
Religious buildings and structures completed in 2020